Pikmin 4 is an upcoming real-time strategy video game developed and published by Nintendo. It will be the fourth main installment of the Pikmin series, following Pikmin 3, and sixth installment overall. It is set for release on the Nintendo Switch on July 21, 2023.

Gameplay

Pikmin 4 utilises the same basic gameplay as its predecessors in the Pikmin series - players control a minuscule leader, who must spend a day on an Earth-like planet, raising Pikmin to use in defeating enemies, securing objects and achieving specific goals in various locations. Pikmin 4 adds a mechanic to deploy Pikmin, and a camera option much closer to the ground, as well as introducing species of Pikmin with new abilities to help solve puzzles and tackle enemies, such as Ice Pikmin who can freeze water and enemies. In addition, the player will be able to command a dog-like creature called Oatchi, who can help carry objects, or transport Pikmin across water. The game's main story will focus on rescuing castaways of a new humanoid race upon the same planet used in the Pikmin series.

Development
On September 7, 2015, Pikmin creator Shigeru Miyamoto confirmed to Eurogamer that Pikmin 4 was in development, and "very close to completion". On July 7, 2016, Miyamoto said in an E3 interview with Game Rant that Pikmin 4 was still in development, though at a lower priority. On June 19, 2017, Miyamoto reassured Eurogamer that the game was still "progressing".

Release
Pikmin 4 was announced by Shigeru Miyamoto in a Nintendo Direct on September 13, 2022. The teaser trailer gives a brief glimpse of the game's environment, without any gameplay or story details. Nintendo announced that the Pikmin T-shirt worn by Miyamoto during the announcement would be released at the Nintendo New York store and Nintendo's website. In the February 8, 2023 Nintendo Direct, Pikmin 4 was revealed to launch on July 21, 2023.

References

Upcoming video games scheduled for 2023
Nintendo Switch games
Nintendo Switch-only games
Video game sequels
Pikmin